Connor James McGovern (born November 3, 1997) is an American football guard for the Buffalo Bills of the National Football League (NFL). He was selected by the Dallas Cowboys in the third round of the 2019 NFL Draft. He played college football at Penn State.

Early years
McGovern attended Lake-Lehman High School. He received Wyoming Valley Football Conference first-team All-League honors in 2013, 2014 and 2015. He was named the Wyoming Valley Football Conference Most Valuable Player and first-team All-state as a senior.

Also practiced basketball and track. He received All-conference honors in basketball as a junior. He was the District 2 shot put champion as a senior in 2015. He also set school strength records in bench press, power clean, squat and deadlift.

College career
McGovern accepted a football scholarship from Penn State University. As a true freshman, he started 9 out of 13 games played at right guard. He was named the Big Ten Freshman of the week during week 10 of his freshman season, and became the first offensive lineman to receive the honor. He also became the third Big Ten offensive lineman to receive any player of the week award since Penn State joined the conference, after Korey Stringer of Ohio State and Sean Poole of Michigan State.

As a sophomore, McGovern was moved from guard to the center position, starting all 13 games. As a junior, he started 12 games at right guard and one at center.

On January 2, 2019, McGovern announced that he would forgo his final year of eligibility and declare for the 2019 NFL Draft.

Professional career

Dallas Cowboys
McGovern was selected by the Dallas Cowboys in the third round (90th overall) of the 2019 NFL Draft. He missed all of the preseason with a torn pectoral muscle. He was placed on the injured reserve list on September 1.

In 2020, he began the season as a backup guard behind Zack Martin and Connor Williams. In the sixth game against the Arizona Cardinals, Martin left the game with a concussion after a handful of snaps, and McGovern replaced him at right offensive guard. He would make his first career start in the next game against the Washington Football Team, while Martin recovered. Martin was later moved to right tackle in the tenth game against the Minnesota Vikings to help stabilize the offensive line performance, and McGovern was named the starter at right guard. He would remain in that role for the rest of the season, after Martin suffered a calf injury in the eleventh game against the Washington Football Team.

In 2021, he would be used in an unusual role. He is naturally a guard, but he lined up as a fullback and tight end under certain schemes from offensive coordinator Kellen Moore.

Buffalo Bills
On March 16, 2023, McGovern signed a three-year contract with the Buffalo Bills.

References

External links
 
 Penn State profile

1997 births
Living people
People from Larksville, Pennsylvania
Players of American football from Pennsylvania
American football centers
American football offensive guards
Penn State Nittany Lions football players
Dallas Cowboys players
Buffalo Bills players